Blatz may refer to:

An American brand of beer formerly produced by the Valentin Blatz Brewing Company
Blatz (band)

For people with surname Blatz, see:
Blatz (surname)